Stagmatophora heydeniella is a moth in the family Cosmopterigidae. It is found in France, Germany, Switzerland, Austria, Italy, the Czech Republic, Poland, Slovakia, Hungary, Romania, North Macedonia, Ukraine and Russia.

The wingspan is 7–9 mm. The forewings are orange red, but blackish at the base and apical angle. There is a pattern in the form of five silver spots and an incomplete band at the base. Adults are on wing from May to July.

The larvae feed on Stachys alopecuros, Stachys officinalis and Stachys sylvatica. They mine the leaves of their host plant. Young larvae create a mine which consists of a large blotch with lobe-like extensions. Later instars create a dense spinning at the underside of the leaf which is connected to the blotch. Most frass is ejected out of the mine, but some is deposited in a broad line in the centre of the blotch. Often, several mines are found in a single leaf. Pupation takes place outside of the mine in the spinning or in a leaf fold. Larvae can be found from August to September. The species overwinters in the pupal stage.

References

Moths described in 1838
Cosmopteriginae
Moths of Europe
Taxa named by Josef Emanuel Fischer von Röslerstamm